is a stable of sumo wrestlers, one of the Nishonoseki group of stables.

History
It was set up in 1971, as Taihō stable, by the 48th yokozuna Taihō Kōki on his retirement from wrestling. The first sekitori he produced was Shishihō in 1977. His most successful wrestler was Ōzutsu, who reached the rank of sekiwake. In May 1981 Taihō was persuaded by the editor of the English language sumo magazine Sumo World to accept a foreign wrestler, Philip Smoak of Texas, who was with the stable for just two months. Taihō passed control of the stable on to his son-in-law Ōtake (former sekiwake Takatōriki) in 2003, as he was approaching the age for mandatory retirement from the Japan Sumo Association. As the name of Taihō was an ichidai-toshiyori (one-generation elder name) it could not be passed on, so the stable was re-named Ōtake. In 2004 the Russian Rohō reached the top division, but was dismissed from sumo in September 2008 after failing a test for cannabis.

In January 2010 the stable, along with the Takanohana, Ōnomatsu and Magaki stable, was forced to leave the Nishonoseki ichimon after Takanohana declared his intention to run as an unofficial candidate in the elections to the Sumo Association's board of directors. The ejected stables formed their own group, which gained ichimon status in 2014. In 2018 the stable joined the Nishonoseki group. 

Following the dismissal of the former Takatōriki for his involvement in a scandal over illegal betting, in July 2010 the stable was taken over by the former jūryō wrestler Dairyū, who had been working as a coach at the stable under the name Futagoyama. Ōsunaarashi reached the top division in 2013, but was forced to retire in March 2018 after being caught driving without a license. As of January 2023, the stable had 14 active wrestlers.

The stable still displays the red tsuna that Taihō wore while performing his kanreki dohyo-iri ceremony in 2000.

In January 2018 a grandson of Taihō, Naya Konosuke, joined the stable. Naya was promoted to jūryō for the January 2021 tournament and changed his name to Ōhō. He is the second member of the stable to reach jūryō since the former Dairyū took over as head coach, following Ōsunaarashi.  Another grandson of Taihō, joined in November 2019, and a third, in March 2020 but they are yet to reach sekitori status.

Ring name conventions
Many wrestlers at this stable take ring names or shikona that include the character 大 (read: ō or dai), which is used in the first character of the stable's name and also is in deference to the last two owners, whose former shikona also included this character. Examples of wrestlers who have incorporated this include Ōsunaarashi, Ōsuzuki, Daiseiryū and Dairyūki.

Owners 
2010-present: 17th Ōtake (Iin former jūryō Dairyū)
2003 - 2010: 16th Ōtake (former sekiwake Takatōriki)
1971 - 2003: Taihō Kōki (the 48th yokozuna, Taihō)

Notable active wrestlers

 Ōhō (best rank, maegashira)

Notable former members
Ōzutsu (former sekiwake)
Rohō (former komusubi)
Shishihō (former maegashira)
Ōnohana (former maegashira)
Ōsunaarashi (former maegashira)
Ōwakamatsu (former maegashira)

Ushers
Shirō (san'yaku yobidashi, real name Yoshikazu Shimada)
Gorō (san'yaku yobidashi, real name Masaharu Akayama)

Hairdresser
Tokonao (3rd class tokoyama)

Location and access
Tokyo, Kotō ward, Kiyosumi 2-8-3
3 minutes from Kiyosumi-shirakawa Station on the Toei Ōedo Line and Hanzōmon Line

See also
List of sumo stables
List of active sumo wrestlers
List of past sumo wrestlers
Glossary of sumo terms

References

External links 
Official site (Japanese)
Japan Sumo Association profile

Active sumo stables